ADI (Associazione per il Disegno Industriale) is an association of about 1.100 designers, manufacturers, trade newspeople, schools and researchers on design based in Italy.

The annual Compasso d'Oro award is granted by the ADI.

References

External links
The official web page of the Associazione per il Disegno Industriale (Italian)
Dolvevita A web page dedicated to lifestyle. Contains an online design museum.

Professional associations based in Italy
Architecture in Italy
Italian design